Titch is a British stop-motion children's television programme that originally aired on Children's ITV from 1997 to 2001, then from 2001 to 1 January 2006 on Tiny Living, before appearing on Milkshake! in September 2004 as Tiny Living went off-air. It was created by Pat Hutchins, also the creator of the Titch book series.

Production
According to Pat Hutchins, each episode took three weeks to shoot as it was created in stop-motion animation, using clay models instead of proposed cartoons. The models were miniatures, as ITV gave the animating team a limited budget so that production or scale was minimalistic. After the first two series finished airing in 1999, a third series went into production, and premiered during 2000, before it had its final episode in mid-2001. There is no disclosed reason why the programme was cancelled, but repeats of the programme aired occasionally until around 2003. The series was then repeated on Tiny Living before moving to Milkshake! on Channel 5 between 5 September 2005 and 15 January 2006.

Music and DVD
The music for Titch was composed by British pianist & composer Michael Nyman.

The series was issued on several videos in the 1990s.  DVDs were released in 2005, titled Picnic and Other Stories and Christmas.

References

External links
 

1990s British children's television series
2000s British children's television series
1990s British animated television series
2000s British animated television series
1997 British television series debuts
2001 British television series endings
British children's animated comedy television series
British stop-motion animated television series
British television shows based on children's books
ITV children's television shows
Animated television series about children
Television series by ITV Studios
Television series by Yorkshire Television
English-language television shows